Smoking in Japan is practiced by around  20,000,000 people,  and the nation is one of the world's largest tobacco markets, though tobacco use has been declining  in recent years.

As of 2019, the Japanese adult smoking rate was 16.7%. By gender, 27.1% of men and 7.6% of women consumed a tobacco product at least once a month. This is the lowest recorded figure since the Ministry of Health, Labour and Welfare or Japan Tobacco began surveying in 1965.

Per capita consumption in 2016 was 1,583 cigarettes, roughly 45% of the peak consumption of 3,497 in 1977.

History

Until 1985, the tobacco industry was a government-run monopoly; the government of Japan is still involved in the industry through the Ministry of Finance, which after a sell-off in March 2013, now owns only one-third of Japan Tobacco's outstanding stock, and the Ministry of Health, Labour and Welfare, which is active in public health and other tobacco control policymaking.

The Ministry of Finance as well as many MPs of Diet of Japan have interests in the tobacco industry and thus tobacco control legislation is lenient, according to the anti-smoking lobby.

Smoking age
Since 1876, the smoking age in Japan has been 20. Although the age of majority was lowered from 20 to 18 in 2022, the smoking age will remain at 20.

Pricing
The price of a particular brand of cigarettes in Japan is set by manufacturers and approved by the Ministry of Finance. A particular brand of cigarettes costs the same across all vendors, from cigarette machines to big supermarkets to corner shops and bulk purchases are not discounted. As of August 2020, the price of a typical pack of cigarettes ranged from ¥400 to ¥530. Proposed tobacco tax hike in October 2020 will increase the price range to ¥450 to ¥570 for typical brands.

Smoking bans

Unlike in many countries, Japan traditionally had outdoor smoking regulations with more lenient indoor smoking regulations. Outdoor smoking is frowned upon on public streets and local governments typically have bylaws banning smoking on busy public streets.

Except for the fire codes, indoor smoking for private businesses was unregulated until 2019. The general consensus was that the local governments have jurisdiction over smoking in public outdoor spaces, but not within private properties including commercial spaces where businesses are conducted. 

In June 2018, the Tokyo Metropolitan Assembly approved indoor smoking regulations targeting commercial spaces in Tokyo and to reduce passive smoking prior to hosting the 2019 Rugby World Cup, 2020 Summer Olympics and Paralympics Games.

In July 2018, the National Diet passed an amendment that bans smoking in public facilities for the first time in the nation's history. The ban was rolled out in stages and fully enforced since April 2020. It makes smoking illegal in public institutions (schools, hospitals, municipal offices etc.) except in special smoking spaces. Restaurants and bars have a ban on indoor smoking except well-ventilated rooms, where drinking or eating is not allowed. However, small pubs like Izakaya are exempted. Establishments with a ¥50 million capitalization or lower and up to 100 m2 floor space can allow smoking if they put up a warning sign.

Indoor smoking ban
Mandatory indoor smoking bans apply to schools, childcare, hospitals, clinics and government administrative buildings throughout Japan. More lenient smoking restrictions apply to other buildings such as workplaces, food establishments and judicial buildings, where indoor smoking is not allowed but a designated smoking room may be constructed, provided access by minors is restricted and no food or drink is served inside. The indoor smoking ban does not apply to smoking clubs or grandfathered food establishments smaller than 100m2, provided no minors are allowed to enter the premises.

Local governments in Japan have the power to enact stricter smoking bylaws. Some prefectures such as Tokyo, Kanagawa and Hyogo have stricter indoor smoking bylaws, although designated indoor smoking areas are typically allowed.

Outdoor smoking ban
Many of the wealthier wards of Tokyo, such as Shinjuku and Shibuya, are applying various kinds of outdoor anti-smoking bylaws. They have designated special outdoor smoking sections in areas and it is punishable by fine if caught smoking outside these areas. Chiyoda-ku banned smoking while walking on busy streets from November 2002, the first local government in Japan to do so.

Starting in 2007, Kyoto began designating certain city streets as non-smoking areas, and have since then been increasing the number of streets designated as such. In a 2010 report, Kyoto Prefecture stated that the major goal of their anti-smoking policies is "to ensure that there is zero chance for people to suffer from second-hand smoke in Kyoto prefecture."

Japanese women and smoking

While a high percentage of men in Japan have smoked throughout in the postwar years, the rate for women for many years hovered between 10 and 15%, followed there too by a decline in recent years to be floating currently a little below 10%.

In the mid-1990s, the number of younger female smokers in particular had risen substantially.  Smoking has since declined among this group as well, but that cohort of women still smokes at a higher rate than their elders.  "The manufacturers were very successful in providing cool images to the consumers," says Ministry of Health and Welfare technical officer Yumiko Mochizuki, when asked to explain the steady rise in female smokers. "Until recently, the Ministry of Health and Welfare had an understanding that smoking was entirely up to the individual."

The government's advertising ban based on the "motherhood" argument was watertight until the tobacco industry was privatized in 1985. Advertising that encourages women to smoke is forbidden in Japan under a voluntary industry agreement. The industry group pledged to voluntarily honor the advertising ban and is charged with enforcing it. United States maker Brown & Williamson sells Capri cigarettes in Japan in slim white boxes with a flower-like design on the cover. R.J. Reynolds' Tokyo billboards for Salem's Pianissimo cigarettes are green-and-pink. Philip Morris advertised its Virginia Slims brand with the slogan "Be You" in an ad campaign.

Other factors contribute to the rise in female smokers. Some observers cite stress, saying that more Japanese women are smoking to relax as more enter the workforce. Media influence is also cited, as many women on popular Japanese television dramas smoke.

Cigarette vending machines

Cigarettes can be bought in tobacco stores and at vending machines, and public ashtrays dot sidewalks and train platforms. The number of cigarette vending machines in Japan was estimated at 500,000 in 2002.
 
The law prohibits the smoking of cigarettes by persons under the age of twenty.

Taspo is a smart card developed by the Tobacco Institute of Japan, the nationwide association of tobacco retailers, and the Japan Vending Machine Manufacturers Association. Introduced in 2008, the card is necessary to purchase cigarettes from vending machines.

In 2008 Japan Tobacco commissioned  a series of over 70 public service announcement style "smoking manner" posters about smoking etiquette. The ads were displayed in a wide variety of formats ranging from placards in the subway to postcards to beverage coasters.

See also
Onshino Tabako

References

External links
 「マナーの気づき1」篇　グラフィック広告（イラスト一覧） Japan Tobacco 

 
Health law in Japan
Politics of Japan
Japanese culture